Matong is a sub-district in the Phrom Phiram District of Phitsanulok Province, Thailand.

Geography
Matong lies in the Nan Basin, which is part of the Chao Phraya watershed.

Administration
The following is a list of the sub-district's muban, which roughly correspond to villages:

References

Tambon of Phitsanulok province
Populated places in Phitsanulok province